The Constitution provides for freedom of religion and creeds and the exercise of all religious rites provided that the public order is not disturbed. The Constitution declares equality of rights and duties for all citizens without discrimination or preference but establishes a balance of power among the major religious groups. The Government generally respected these rights; however restricted the constitutional provision for apportioning political offices according to religious affiliation since the National Pact agreement. There were periodic reports of tension between religious groups, attributable to competition for political power, and citizens continued to struggle with the legacy of the civil war that was fought along sectarian lines. Despite sectarian tensions caused by the competition for political power, Lebanese continued to coexist.

Religious demography

The country, founded as a modern state in 1943, has a population of over 6 million. Because parity among confessional groups remains a sensitive issue, a national census has not been conducted since 1932. However, the most recent demographic study conducted by Statistics Lebanon, a Beirut-based research firm, found that approximately Lebanon's population is estimated to be 54% Muslim (27% Shia; 27% Sunni), 5.6% Druze, who do not consider themselves to be Muslims but under the Lebanese political division (Parliament of Lebanon Seat Allocation) the Druze community is designated as one of the five Lebanese Muslim communities (Sunni, Shia, Druze, Alawi, and Ismaili); 40.4% Christian (21% Maronite, 8% Greek Orthodox, 5% Melkite, 1% Protestant and 4 percent Armenian, 1 percent other Christians. There are also very small numbers of Jews, Baháʼís, Mormons, Buddhists, and Hindus.

Of the 18 officially recognized religious groups, 4 are Muslim, 12 Christian, 1 Druze, and 1 Jewish. The main branches of Islam are Shi'a and Sunni. The smallest Muslim communities are the Shia offshoots like Alawites and the Ismaili ("Sevener") Shi'a order. The Maronite community, by far the largest Christian group, has had a centuries-long affiliation with the Roman Catholic Church but has its own patriarch, liturgy, and ecclesiastical customs. The second largest Christian group is the Greek Orthodox Church who maintain a Greek-language liturgy. Other Lebanese Christians are also Melkite Catholics, Protestant Christians like evangelicals (including Protestant groups such as the Baptists and Seventh-day Adventists), and Latins (Roman Catholic). Other non-native to Lebanon Christian groups are divided among Armenian Orthodox (Gregorians), Armenian Catholics, Syriac Orthodox (Jacobites), Syriac Catholics, Assyrians (Nestorians), Chaldean, and Copts. The Lebanese Druze, who refer to themselves as al-Muwahhideen, or "believers in one God," are concentrated in the rural, mountainous areas east and south of Beirut. Divisions and rivalries between various groups date back many centuries, and while relationships between religious adherents of different confessions were generally amicable, group identity was highly significant in most aspects of cultural interaction.

Foreign missionaries present in the country operated missions, schools, hospitals, and places of worship.

Many persons fleeing religious mistreatment and discrimination in neighboring states have immigrated to the country, including Kurds, Shi'a, and Assyrians/Chaldeans from Iraq, as well as Copts from Egypt, Sudan and Libya. Precise figures were unavailable due to the lack of census data and the tendency of these groups to assimilate into the culture.

Legal and policy framework
The Constitution provides for freedom of religion and the freedom to practice all religious rites provided that public order is not disturbed. The Constitution requires the state to respect all religions and denominations and guarantee respect for the personal status and religious interests of persons of every religious sect. The Constitution declares equality of rights and duties for all citizens without discrimination or preference but stipulates a balance of power distributed among the major religious groups. The Government generally respected these rights in practice; however, there were some restrictions, and the constitutional provision for apportioning political offices according to religious affiliation may be viewed as inherently discriminatory.

The Government permits recognized religious groups to exercise authority over matters pertaining to personal status, such as marriage, divorce, child custody, and inheritance. The "Twelver" Shi'a, Sunni, Christian, and Druze confessions have state-appointed, government-subsidized clerical courts that administer family and personal status law.

The Constitution provides that Lebanese Christians and Lebanese Muslims be represented equally in Parliament, the Cabinet, and high-level civil service positions, which include the ministry ranks of Secretary General and Director General. It also provides that these posts be distributed proportionally among the recognized religious groups. The constitutional provision for the distribution of political power and positions according to the principle of religious representation is designed to prevent a dominant position being gained by any one confessional group. The "National Pact" of 1943 stipulates that the president, prime minister, and speaker of parliament be Maronite Christian, Sunni Muslim, and Shi'a Muslim, respectively. This distribution of political power functions at both the national and local levels of government.

The 1989 Taif Agreement, which ended the country's 15-year civil war, reaffirmed this arrangement but, significantly, mandated increased Muslim representation in Parliament so that it would be equal to that of the Christian community and reduced the power of the Christian Maronite presidency. In addition, the Taif Agreement, which concluded the country's 15-year civil war, endorsed the constitutional provision of appointing most senior government officials according to religious affiliation. This practice is operative in all three branches of government. The Taif Agreement also stipulated a cabinet with power equally allocated between Muslims and Christians. The political establishment has been reluctant to change this "confessional" system, because citizens perceive it as critical to the country's stability.

Formal recognition by the Government is a legal requirement for religious groups to conduct most religious activities. A group that seeks official recognition must submit a statement of its doctrine and moral principles for government review to ensure that such principles do not contradict popular values or the Constitution. The group must ensure that the number of its adherents is sufficient to maintain its continuity.

Alternatively, religious groups may apply for recognition through recognized religious groups. Official recognition conveys certain benefits, such as tax-exempt status and the right to apply the religion's codes to personal status matters. An individual may change religions if the head of the religious group the person wishes to join approves of this change. Refusal is not reported to occur in practice. Religion is encoded on national identity cards and noted on ikhraaj qaid (official registry) documents, and the Government complies with requests of citizens to change their civil records to reflect their new religious status.

Some religious groups do not enjoy official recognition, such as Baháʼís, Buddhists, Hindus, and unregistered Protestant Christian groups. They are disadvantaged under the law in that their members do not qualify for certain government positions, but they are permitted to perform their religious rites freely. For example, a follower of the Baháʼí Faith cannot run for Parliament as a Baháʼí candidate because there is no seat allocated for the confession, nor could such an individual hold senior positions in the Government, as these are also allocated on a confessional basis. However, a number of members of unregistered religious groups are recorded under the recognized religions. For example, most Baháʼís are registered under the Shi'a sect. As such, a member of the Baháʼí community can run for office and fill a seat allocated to the Shi'a sect. Similarly, Mormons are registered under the Greek Orthodox faith. Government decisions on granting official recognition of religious groups do not appear to be arbitrary.

The Government permits the publication in different languages of religious materials of every registered religion.

The Government recognizes the following holy days as national holidays: Armenian Christmas, Eid al-Adha, St. Maroun Day, Islamic New Year, Ashura, Good Friday, Easter (both Western and Eastern rites), the birth of the Prophet Muhammad, All Saints' Day, Feast of the Assumption, Eid al-Fitr, and Christmas. The Government also excuses Armenian public sector employees from work on St. Vartan Day.

Restrictions on religious freedom
The 1989 Ta'if Agreement called for the eventual elimination of political sectarianism in favor of "expertise and competence;" however, little progress has been made in this regard.

Unrecognized groups, such as Baháʼís, Buddhists, Hindus, and some evangelical denominations, may own property and assemble for worship without government interference; however, they are disadvantaged under the law because legally they may not marry, divorce, or inherit property in the country. Protestant evangelical churches are required to register with the Evangelical Synod, a nongovernmental advisory group that represents those churches with the Government. It is self-governing and oversees religious matters for Protestant congregations. Representatives of some churches have complained that the Synod has refused to accept new Protestant groups into its membership since 1975, thereby crippling their clergy's ability to minister to the members of those communities
Many families have relatives who belong to different religious communities, and intermarriage is not uncommon; however, intermarriage is difficult to arrange in practice between members of some groups. Shari'a, which applies to personal status matters of Muslims, forbids the marriage of a non-Muslim male to a Muslim woman. Druze religious leaders will perform marriages only of Druze couples. There are no procedures for civil marriage; however, the Government recognizes civil marriage ceremonies performed outside the country.

Proselytizing (or converting people to another religion), while it is not punishable by law, it is strongly discouraged by religious leaders and communities, sometimes with the threat of violence. The respective sect's leadership councils make appointments to senior clerical posts. For example, the nomination of Sunni and Shi'a muftis is officially endorsed by the Government's Council of Ministers, and they receive monthly salaries from the Government. The Government appoints and pays the salaries of Muslim and Druze ecclesiastical judges. The leaders of other religious groups, such as Roman Catholics and Greek Orthodox, do not receive salaries from the Government.

The Government does not require citizens' religious affiliations to be indicated on their passports; however, religious affiliation is encoded on national identity cards and noted on ikhraaj qaid documents. The ikhraj qaid, a civil document that indicates personal status information, can be presented by citizens instead of an identity card when they apply for various purposes, such as to obtain government employment or to enroll in or be employed at a university.

In most cases religious groups administer their own family and personal status laws. Many of these laws discriminate against women. For example, Sunni inheritance law provides a son twice the inheritance of a daughter. Although Muslim men may divorce easily, Muslim women may do so only with the concurrence of their husbands.

Article 473 of the Penal Code of Lebanon stipulates a maximum prison term of 1 year for anyone convicted of "blaspheming God publicly." There were no prosecutions reported under this law during the reporting period.

Students and teachers found to be working while on tourist visas are deemed to have violated their visa status and are consequently deported. The same sanction applies to religious workers not working under the auspices of a government-registered religious organization.

There were no reports of religious prisoners or detainees in the country.

Forced religious conversion
There were no reports of forced religious conversion within Lebanon.

A permanent search warrant remained in effect for the 2002 killing of an American citizen missionary affiliated with the Christian and Missionary Evangelical Alliance in Sidon, although the case was officially closed in April 2004. Investigations at the time of the killing suggested that Sunni extremists, possibly operating from the nearby Ain al-Hilweh Palestinian refugee camp, were responsible.

See also
Religion in Lebanon
Secularism in Lebanon
Human rights in Lebanon

References

 United States Bureau of Democracy, Human Rights and Labor. Lebanon: International Religious Freedom Report 2007. This article incorporates text from this source, which is in the public domain.
 
 

Lebanon
Human rights in Lebanon
Religion in Lebanon